Scolopendracarus is a genus of mites in the family Laelapidae.

Species
 Scolopendracarus brevipilis Evans, 1955

References

Laelapidae